Agonopterix parinkini is a moth in the family Depressariidae. It was described by Alexandr L. Lvovsky in 2011. It is found in Nepal.

The wingspan is 18–23 mm. The forewings are white with pale yellow tint and dark specks. The discal point is white surrounded with a large fuscous spot. There is a black spot at the costal margin near the apex and a black point in the middle of the cell. There is a black dotted line along the costal and outer margins. The hindwings are white or pale grey.

Etymology
The species is named are after the Russian zoologist Alexandr Petrovich Parinkin.

References

Moths described in 2011
Agonopterix
Moths of Asia